Yury Andreyevich Morozov (13 May 1934 – 15 February 2005) was one of the best football coaches from the Soviet Union.

He made his name as a midfielder in the 1950s and 1960s with his hometown clubs FC Zenit, Admiralteyets and FC Dinamo Leningrad, earning himself a call-up to the USSR 'B' team.

He retired from playing at the age of 31 and worked at FC Zenit's youth academy and became a dean of football science at the Lesgaft Academy of Physical Education. He then joined Valery Lobanovsky's USSR coaching staff, assisting the famous coach at the 1976 Olympics, where they won bronze, and in their run to the 1988 UEFA European Championship final. He also worked with Lobanovsky at clubs in the Middle East at the helm of the Kuwaiti national side.

In 1977, having previously been part of the coachings staff at Spartak Moscow, he took on his first head coach's job with former club Zenit leading them to third place in the Soviet Supreme League in 1980, their highest-ever finish at the time. He had three spells as head coach at FC Zenit over a 15-year period and in 1984 the team he built became Soviet champions for the only time. He left the club for the final time in 2002 due to ill health but returned to coaching at FC Petrotrest St. Peterburg.

References

External links
  Career details

1934 births
2005 deaths
Russian footballers
Soviet footballers
FC Zenit Saint Petersburg players
Russian football managers
Russian expatriate football managers
Soviet football managers
FC Zenit Saint Petersburg managers
FC Dynamo Kyiv managers
PFC CSKA Moscow managers
Soviet Union national football team managers
Association football midfielders
FC Dynamo Saint Petersburg players